Hyllisia saigonensis is a species of beetle in the family Cerambycidae. It was described by Pic in 1933.

References

saigonensis
Beetles described in 1933
Taxa named by Maurice Pic